Wheeldon v Burrows (1879) LR 12 Ch D 31 is an English land law case confirming and governing a means of the implied grant or grants of easements — the implied grant of all continuous and apparent inchoate easements (quasi easements, that is they would be easements if the land were not before transfer in unity of possession and title) to a transferree of part, unless expressly excluded. The case consolidated one of the three current methods by which an easement can be acquired by implied grant.

It was little altered by subsequent case law by 1925 but has been further consolidated by section 62 of the Law of Property Act 1925.  Both types of implied grant are widely excluded in agreements by sellers of part and to some extent other transferors of part, so that the retained land can be developed subject to general and local planning law constraints.

Facts
Mr Tetley owned a piece of land and a workshop in Derby, which had windows overlooking and receiving light from the first piece of land. He sold the workshop to Mr Burrows, and the piece of land to Mr Wheeldon. Mr Wheeldon's widow (Mrs Wheeldon, the plaintiff) built on the piece of land, and it obstructed the windows of Mr Burrows' workshop. In response, Mr Burrows dismantled Mrs Wheeldon's construction, asserting an easement over the light passing through Wheeldon's lot. Mrs Wheeldon brought an action in trespass.

Judgment
Thesiger LJ held that because the seller had not reserved the right of access of light to the windows, no such right passed to the purchaser of the workshop. So the buyer of the land could obstruct the workshop windows with building. However the principles governing the area of law where  are referred to said the following.

See also
English land law
Easements in English law

Notes

English property case law
1879 in British law
English land case law
Court of Appeal (England and Wales) cases
1879 in case law